Descinolone acetonide (developmental code name CL-27071), also known as desoxytriamcinolone acetonide, is a synthetic glucocorticoid corticosteroid which was never marketed.

References

Acetonides
Cyclohexanols
Corticosteroid cyclic ketals
Diketones
Fluoroarenes
Glucocorticoids
Pregnanes
Enones